Andrea Bunjes (born 5 February 1976 in Holtland, Lower Saxony) is a German hammer thrower. She is a member of the Eintracht Frankfurt athletes team. Her personal best throw is 70.73 metres, achieved during the qualification round at the 2004 Olympics. This ranks her fourth among German hammer throwers, behind Betty Heidler, Susanne Keil and Kathrin Klaas. She is a one-time national champion in the women's hammer throw (2004).

Achievements

References

1976 births
Living people
People from Leer (district)
German female hammer throwers
Athletes (track and field) at the 2004 Summer Olympics
Olympic athletes of Germany
Eintracht Frankfurt athletes
Sportspeople from Lower Saxony